Filmworks VIII: 1997 features two scores for film by John Zorn released on Zorn's own label, Tzadik Records, in 1998.   It features the music that Zorn wrote and recorded for The Port of Last Resort (1998), a documentary directed by Joan Grossman and Paul Rosdy examining the experiences of Jewish refugees in Shanghai and Latin Boys Go to Hell (1997) which was directed by Ela Troyano.

The tracks for Port of Last Resort are performed by the Masada String Trio with the addition of Min Xiao-Fen (pipa), Marc Ribot (guitar) and Anthony Coleman (piano).  Tracks for Latin Boys Go to Hell feature the percussion of Cyro Baptista and Kenny Wollesen.

Reception

The Allmusic review by Joslyn Layne awarded the album 4½ stars noting that "The sophisticated music of Film Works 8 stands apart for its cosmopolitan assuredness, high level of musicianship, and beauty".

Track listing
The Port Of Last Resort (1998) directed by Joan Grossman and Paul Rosdy.
1. "Teqiah"  - 3:07 
2. "Shanghai" - 2:35 
3. "Emunim" - 3:32 
4. "Ruan (guitar version)" - 4:37 
5. "Ebionim" - 3:00 
6. "Ahavah" - 3:42 
7. "Ruan (pipa version)" - 3:37 
8. "Livant" - 1:54 
9. "Or Ne'erav" - 6:58 
10. "Shanim" - 2:03 
11. "Ruan (solo piano)" - 3:42
Recorded at Avatar Studio, New York City on November 9, 1997
Mark Feldman – violin
Marc Ribot – guitars
Erik Friedlander – cello
Min Xiao-Fen – pipa
Greg Cohen – bass
Anthony Coleman – piano
Latin Boys Go To Hell (1997) directed by Ela Troyano
12. "Deseo" - 2:28 
13. "Mentiras" - 2:15 
14. "Ansiedad" - 2:55 
15. "Locura" - 2:47 
16. "Sangre" - 1:02 
17. "Olvido" - 2:21 
18. "Engano" - 2:25 
19. "Traicion" - 2:25 
20. "Ilusion" - 2:43 
21. "Lagrimas" - 4:14
Recorded at Creative Audio, New York City on July 22, 1997
Cyro Baptista – percussion
Kenny Wollesen – drums, vibraphone, percussion
All compositions by John Zorn

References

Tzadik Records soundtracks
Albums produced by John Zorn
John Zorn soundtracks
1998 soundtrack albums
Film soundtracks
Soundtrack compilation albums
Tzadik Records compilation albums